1374 Isora, provisional designation , is a stony asteroid and eccentric Mars-crosser from the innermost regions of the asteroid belt, approximately 5 kilometers in diameter. It was discovered on 21 October 1935, by Belgian astronomer Eugène Delporte at Uccle Observatory in Belgium.

Orbit and classification 

In the SMASS taxonomy, Isora is classified as a Sq-type, an intermediary between the abundant S and rather rare Q-type asteroids. It orbits the Sun at a distance of 1.6–2.9 AU once every 3 years and 5 months (1,233 days). Its orbit has an eccentricity of 0.28 and an inclination of 5° with respect to the ecliptic. Isoras observation arc begins with its official discovery observation at Uccle, as no precoveries were taken and no prior identifications were made.

Physical characteristics 

In January 2014, a rotational light-curve of Isora was obtained by American astronomer Robert D. Stephens at the Center for Solar System Studies (CS3) in California. Light-curve analysis gave a longer than average rotation period of 36.699 hours with a brightness variation of 0.12 magnitude. However, a second period solution of 18.35 hours is also possible. The result supersedes photometric observations taken by Wiesław Z. Wiśniewski in 1989, which rendered a fragmentary light-curve with a period of 8 hours.

The Collaborative Asteroid Lightcurve Link assumes a standard albedo for stony asteroids of 0.20 and derives a diameter of 5.48 kilometers using an absolute magnitude of 13.67.

Naming 

Isora is the backwards spelled feminine name "Rosi" with an appended "a". Naming was proposed by Gustav Stracke (1887–1943) – astronomer at the German Astronomisches Rechen-Institut, and after whom the minor planet 1019 Strackea is named – and first cited by Paul Herget in his The Names of the Minor Planets in 1955.

References

External links 
 Asteroid Lightcurve Database (LCDB), query form (info )
 Dictionary of Minor Planet Names, Google books
 Asteroids and comets rotation curves, CdR – Observatoire de Genève, Raoul Behrend
 Discovery Circumstances: Numbered Minor Planets (1)-(5000) – Minor Planet Center
 
 

001374
Discoveries by Eugène Joseph Delporte
Named minor planets
001374
19351021